Gijón Polytechnic School of Engineering, is one of the schools and faculties of the University of Oviedo. The school is located in Gijón, Asturias (Spain).

In the academic year 2011-12 the school had 4,769 students enrolled, being the educational center of the University of Oviedo with more students.

History 
The Gijón Polytechnic School of Engineering is the center formed by the merger of the School of Industrial Engineering of Gijón with the School of Engineering Technical Informatics and Telematics of Gijon and Polytechnic School of Engineering of Gijón, held in 2010.

University School of Industrial Engineering of Gijón 
The January 20 of 1888 Gijón opens in a school district of the Central School of Arts and Crafts in Madrid, installed in the street Institute, in the building that later would become headquarters Spain bank branch in Gijon. Would this School of Arts and Crafts in Gijon which by decree 1377/1972 of 10 May should become  School of Engineering of Gijón  integrated into the University of Oviedo. Previously, the August 17 of 1901 had taken the name of  School of Industries.  The December 16 of 1910 was renamed  Industrial School . In 1929 returns to rename  Higher School of Work  in 1942 and  School of Industrial Experts.

By Royal Decree 1457/1991 of 27 September, the  School of Industrial Engineering of the Center of Integrated Teaching of Gijon  joined the  College of Engineering Technique Gijón .

Technical School of Computer Engineering and Telematics Gijon 
The E.U. Gijon Computing was created in 1982. Its first steps run from the hand of Department of Trade, Tourism and Social Sciences Jovellanos | EU Business Studies "Jovellanos" Gijon with which it shares government bodies, facilities and personnel. The degree offered by the E.U. Informatics is the Diploma in Computer Science, in its two specialties: Management and Systems.

In 1990 the separation of the two centers occurs, the EU transladándose Computing the new campus, sharing facilities ETS Industrial Engineering and the facilities and personnel administration and services ES Civil Navy.

A Council of Universities, dated July 20, 1992 changed its name to EUIT Computer Gijon.

During 1992 to 1993 it enters into force a new curriculum and begin to be taught degrees of Technical Engineer in Computer Management and Technical Engineering in Computer Systems. In 1994-95 new facilities Aulario Viesques Campus, where the Centre's management is definitely located, the Library Administrative Services and the Student are inaugurated.

During the academic year 2000-01 are effective current curricula of computer degrees and in the 2002-2003 plan corresponding to the degree of Engineer of Telecommunications, specializing in Telematics studies.

Polytechnic School of Engineering of Gijón 
The Polytechnic School of Engineering of Gijón born as School of Industrial Engineering of Gijón by agreement of Government of Spain was April 18 of 1975 ( Decree 1434/1975 of June 19 - Official State Gazette of July 1). The first academic year began in 1978, and classrooms of the School of Industrial Engineering of Gijón were used. It was not until 1983 when the new school building was inaugurated.

A new change of name to  Higher Technical School of Industrial Engineers and Computer Engineers of Gijon  by Royal Decree 1457/1991 (BOE of October 12 of 1991, Art. 6 was carried out, Item 3), when the new Engineering degree in Computer Science was authorized.

The Official Gazette of the Principality of Asturias of October 8 of 2002 published Decree 121/2002 by which we proceeded to a new change of name to the Higher Polytechnic School of Engineering Gijon after having begun to teach the new Telecommunications Engineering last year.

Students enrolled 2015-2016 
 Industrial Chemical Engineering: 45 students
 Industrial Technology Engineering: 103 students
 Mechanical Engineering: 201 students
 Electrical Engineering: 60 students
 Automation and Industrial Electronics Engineering: 98 students
 Computer Engineering in Information Technology: 56 students
 Engineering Technologies and Telecommunication Services: 94 students

Degrees 
Degrees offered at Gijón Polytechnic School of Engineering are adjusted to the European Higher Education Area (EHEA).
Undergraduate programs:
Bachelor of electrical engineering
Bachelor of industrial technology
Bachelor of mechanical engineering
Bachelor of chemical and process engineering
Bachelor of electronic engineering and automation
Bachelor of computer engineering in information and communications technology
Bachelor in information and communications technology and telecommunications engineering
Graduate programs:
Master of Mechanics, Design, Construction and Manufacturing
Erasmus Mundus Master of Energy Engineering
Erasmus Mundus Master of Mechatronics
Master of Computer Systems and services for Internet
Master of Mobile Nets Technology

International Programs 

The University of Oviedo and Gijón EPI offer multiple mobility options for students of official studies (Grade, 1st or 2nd Cycle, Official Masters or Ph.D.) who wish to have an experience off campus and also receives a lot of students from around the world.

Among the programs to which affiliates are located they are:

 The scholarships Erasmus
 ERASMUS practices
 Cooperation Agreements
 SICUE Program.

Wikipedia in the EPI 

Thursday October 22, 2015, at 17:00, was held in the Library of North Aulario a round table with the participation of Wikipedia, Princess of Asturias Award for International Cooperation. The conversation focused on digital and social entrepreneurs, based on the history of Wikipedia. Jimmy Wales stepped in, Patricio Lorente and Lila Tretikov Wikimedia Foundation, the event was moderated by Marian Garcia and Ramon Rubio, teachers Gijón Polytechnic School of Engineering.

References

External links 
 Official web site

University of Oviedo
Engineering universities and colleges in Spain
Gijón
1880s establishments in Spain
Universities and colleges in Spain